The 2013 Baden Masters were held from August 30 to September 1 at the Curling Center Baden Regio in Baden, Switzerland. The event was held in a round robin format, and the purse for the event was CHF 32,500, of which the winner, Brad Gushue, received CHF 11,000. Gushue defeated Thomas Ulsrud with a score of 4–3 in the final in an extra end to win his third Baden Masters title.

Teams
The teams are listed as follows:

Round-robin standings
Final round-robin standings

Playoffs

References

External links

2013 in curling
2013 in Swiss sport
Baden Masters